Severino Lojodice (born 25 October 1933, in Milan) is a retired Italian professional footballer who played as a midfielder.

Honours
Juventus
 Serie A champion: 1959–60.
 Coppa Italia winner: 1959–60.

1933 births
Living people
Italian footballers
Serie A players
U.S. Cremonese players
A.C. Monza players
A.S. Roma players
Juventus F.C. players
U.C. Sampdoria players
Brescia Calcio players
S.S.D. Pro Sesto players
Association football midfielders
A.S.D. Fanfulla players